Kenzie Ruston Hemric (born October 12, 1991) is an American former professional stock car racing driver. She last competed in the NASCAR K&N Pro Series East in 2015, driving the No. 4 Toyota Camry for Rev Racing. Hemric is married to current NASCAR Xfinity Series driver Daniel Hemric.

Hemric began her professional stock car racing career in the 2011 ARCA Racing Series, driving four races for Venturini Motorsports. She later competed as a NASCAR Drive for Diversity member in the K&N Pro Series East, where she competed for three seasons (2013–15). Her best career finish came in 2014 at Iowa Speedway, where she finished second.

Racing career

Early career
Ruston both raced and played volleyball in high school before deciding to focus on racing full-time prior to her senior year; she began racing Bandoleros at Texas Motor Speedway (TMS) when she was 14 years old. When she was 16, she switched to Legends car racing, competing in the track's Semi-Pro and Young Lions divisions, finishing third in the latter's Winter Series. In addition, she raced in TMS' Summer Stampede, finishing second, and in the top-ten in Charlotte Motor Speedway's Summer Shootout. Upon turning 17, Ruston moved to North Carolina. In 2009, Ruston won TMS' Winter Series, Summer Stampede and the track's Driver of the Year award, along with the U.S. Legends asphalt championship, the first woman to win the title. The next year, she began racing in super late models, finishing 12th in the PASS Series Southern Division's championship.

Stock car racing
In 2011, Ruston began competing in stock cars. She made four ARCA Racing Series races with Venturini Motorsports, making her debut at Toledo Speedway in the No. 25 Toyota, and finished 10th. She switched to No. 55 for three additional races, finishing 10th, 12th, and 26th. During the year, she also competed in the Champion Racing Association, winning at Lucas Oil Raceway at Indianapolis. In December, she participated in the Snowball Derby at Five Flags Speedway for Jeff Fultz, finishing 31st after a crash on lap 145.

NASCAR

In 2013, Ruston was signed by Turner Scott Motorsports to contest the 2013 K&N Pro Series East season, and in June, she was named a member of the NASCAR Next program, the first woman to join the program. She ended the year with four top-fives, including a best finish of third at Greenville-Pickens Speedway, and finished sixth in the points standings.

For the 2014 season, Ruston was signed by Ben Kennedy Racing. She was not retained by Kennedy at the end of the season due to sponsorship, being replaced by Kaz Grala.

On January 26, 2015, Ruston was announced as a member of the 2015 Drive for Diversity roster, joining Rev Racing for the full 2015 NASCAR K&N Pro Series East season. She finished 11th in the points standings, with a best finish of sixth at Motordrome Speedway.

Personal life
Ruston's father, Darren, was a dirt bike racer in Oklahoma, while her step-grandfather, Jerry Morrison, was an Oklahoma dirt track racer. The youngest of two daughters, Ruston was a cheerleader and volleyball, soccer, and basketball player in high school.

On July 28, 2015, Ruston became engaged to Camping World Truck Series driver Daniel Hemric. They married on January 7, 2017. In November 2019, the Hemrics announced that they were expecting their first child. Their daughter was born on May 9, 2020. In August 2022, the Hemrics announced that they were expecting their second child. Their son was born on December 23, 2022.

Motorsports career results

Career summary

NASCAR
(key) (Bold – Pole position awarded by qualifying time. Italics – Pole position earned by points standings or practice time. * – Most laps led.)

K&N Pro Series East

ARCA Racing Series
(key) (Bold – Pole position awarded by qualifying time. Italics – Pole position earned by points standings or practice time. * – Most laps led.)

 Season still in progress
 Ineligible for series points

References

External links

 

Living people
1991 births
Racing drivers from Oklahoma
NASCAR drivers
American female racing drivers
Racing drivers' wives and girlfriends
21st-century American women
ARCA Midwest Tour drivers